Shiv Narayan Fotedar (1904 -6 December 1976) was a Member of Parliament of the 1st Lok Sabha of India.

References 

India MPs 1952–1957
1904 births
1976 deaths
People from Srinagar
Indian people of Kashmiri descent
Kashmiri Pandits